Ludvík Liška (8 April 1929 – 19 February 2021) was a Czechsolovakian middle-distance runner. He competed in the men's 800 metres at the 1952 Summer Olympics.

References

External links
 

1929 births
2021 deaths
Athletes (track and field) at the 1952 Summer Olympics
Czechoslovak male middle-distance runners
Olympic athletes of Czechoslovakia